Papyrus Oxyrhynchus 1 (P. Oxy. 1) is a papyrus fragment of the logia of Jesus written in Greek (Logia Iesou). It was among the first of the Oxyrhynchus Papyri discovered by Grenfell and Hunt. It was discovered on the second day of excavation, 12 January 1897, in the garbage mounds in the Egyptian town of Oxyrhynchus.  The fragment is dated to the early half of the 3rd century.  Grenfell and Hunt originally dated the fragment between 150 and 300, but "probably not written much later than the year 200." It was later discovered to be the oldest manuscript of the Gospel of Thomas.


Description
The manuscript was written on papyrus in codex form. The text is written in uncial letters, with one column per page and 21 lines per page, in a reformed documentary hand. The last line is fragmented. There is a pagination at the upper right corner (number ΙΑ = 11 on the verso). The nomina sacra are written in an abbreviated way (ΙΣ, ΘΥ, ΠΡΑ, ΑΝΩΝ).

According to Grenfell and Hunt, who identified this fragment only as Logia Iesu ("Sayings of Jesus"), the original manuscript contained a collection of Jesus's sayings, which were independent of the four Gospels in their present form. They classified it as non-heretical and placed the origin of its sayings as earlier than 140 A.D. They observed some parallels with the works of Clement of Alexandria.

History
Grenfell and Hunt did not realize they had discovered part of the Gospel of Thomas, as at the time there was no reference text. The only complete copy of the Gospel of Thomas was found in 1945 when a Coptic version was discovered at Nag Hammadi with a collection of early Christian Gnostic texts, and it was only after that discovery that the text of Oxyrhynchus Papyri I was able to be attributed.

The fragment contains logia (sayings) 26–28 of the Gospel of Thomas on the recto, and logia 29–33 on the verso of the leaf. with what appears as the last two sentences of logion 77 in the Nag Hammadi Coptic version included at the end of logion 30.
Grenfell and Hunt also discovered another two fragments of this apocryphal Gospel: P. Oxy. 654 and P. Oxy. 655.

It was discovered by Hunt on the second day of the excavations.
In November 1900, P. Oxy. 1 was given to the Bodleian Library by the Egypt Exploration Fund. The fragment is housed at the Bodleian Library (Ms. Gr. th. e 7 (P)).

See also 
 Oxyrhynchus Papyri
 Papyrus Oxyrhynchus 2
 Nag Hammadi Codex II
 British Library Or 4926

References

Further reading 
 B. P. Grenfell, A. S. Hunt, Sayings of Our Lord from an early Greek Papyrus (Egypt Exploration Fund; 1897).
 
 Nicholas Perrin, HC II,2 and the Oxyrhynchus Fragments (P. Oxy 1, 654, 655): Overlooked Evidence for a Syriac "Gospel of Thomas", Vigiliae Christianae, Vol. 58, No. 2 (May, 2004), pp. 138–151

External links 

 P. Oxy. 1 at the Oxyrhynchus Online
 Papyrus Oxyrhynchus 1 agraphos.com
 Greek text with English translation
 P. Oxy. 1 LDAB

001
Gnostic Gospels
3rd-century manuscripts